Adam Muhammad Subarkah (born 22 February 1979), also known as Adam, is an Indonesian musician. He is the bassist for the music group Sheila on 7.

Personal life
Adam studied  at the Department of International Relations, Fisipol, UGM Yogyakarta.

Adam married Umi Arimbi Khallistasani, the holder of the Miss Talented title in Miss Indonesia 2003, in 2005.

References

1979 births
Living people
Indonesian bassists
Indonesian songwriters
Multi-instrumentalists